Singham is a 2011 Indian Hindi-language action film directed by Rohit Shetty and produced by Reliance Entertainment, based on a script by writers Yunus Sajawal and Farhad-Sajid. It serves as first installment of Shetty's Cop Universe. A remake of the 2010 Tamil film of the same title by Hari, the film stars Ajay Devgn in the lead role as a police officer named Bajirao Singham alongside Kajal Aggarwal and Prakash Raj who reprises his role as in original.

It was theatrically released in India on 22 July 2011 with a strong box office response; the film earned 876 million in India on the first day and a worldwide total of  against a  budget, becoming a box-office blockbuster.

Following the film's success, Devgn and Shetty collaborated for the sequel Singham Returns (2014). Devgn reprised his role in Shetty's directorials Simmba (2018) and Sooryavanshi (2021) which together form Shetty's Cop Universe.

Plot
Inspector Rakesh Kadam is an honest police officer who ends up committing suicide due to the false accusations of corruption levelled against him by Jaikant Shikre, a crime boss, businessman and politician in Goa running various rackets like kidnapping, extortion and smuggling. Kadam's wife Megha vows revenge against Jaikant in front of him, exclaiming that God will dispense justice to him for this act.

The story moves to Shivgad, a small village near the Goa-Maharashtra border. Bajirao Singham, an honest police officer like Kadam, is in charge of the Shivgad police station. A station house officer in charge of his town, he resolves most of the problems in his town informally and without filing charge sheets, thereby gaining much reputation and love from the villagers. Gautam "Gotya" Bhosle is an industrialist and Bajirao's father Manikrao "Manya" Singham's childhood friend. He comes to Shivgad with his wife and daughters Kavya and Anjali. Eventually, Singham and Kavya fall in love with each other. Their courtship takes place through a series of comic events where she initially hates him after he slaps her tight when she is caught frightening villagers disguising as a ghost, but then has a change of heart when she sees his honest and simple nature and finds that he wants to apologize for his behaviour.

Everything seems to run smoothly until Jaikant, who is given conditional bail for a murder he had committed, is required to travel to Shivgad to sign the bail through a fortnight. Acting on the recommendation of his top lieutenant Shiva Naik, he instead sends one of his allies, Vitthal Dalvi, and his men, to do the formalities, much to the fury of Singham who demands Jaikant sign the bail-in person within the next four hours. An enraged Jaikant reaches Shivgad to confront Singham, but the villagers, upon hearing of his comments against Singham, threaten to finish him off, damaging his convoy's vehicles in a dramatic show of public power. Singham asks his assistant, Ramesh Kelkar, to bring the register containing Jaikant's record, forces a thumb impression of Jaikant's left hand onto the register, and warns him to continue signing the bail for the remaining 14 days, as a humiliated Jaikant looks on terrified by Singham's courage and leaves the village on foot as a sign of protest, refusing to travel by wheels. On the highway, as he stops at a point, he recalls his humiliation, learns of Singham's background from Shiva through a source, and using his political contacts, gets Singham transferred to Goa to seek revenge.

Singham, unaware of Jaikant's hand behind his transfer, joins the Colva police station in Goa as the in-charge, when on the very first day, he is confronted by Jaikant, who shows Singham his true colours and tries to intimidate him by mentioning how the officer preceding him ended up committing suicide, warning Singham that he is out to trouble him to no end. Eventually, in a discussion with his co-workers and juniors, Sub-Inspector Dev Phadnis, Sub-Inspector Abbas Malik, and Head Constable Prabhu Sawalkar, he learns how much the three officers hate Jaikant for his crimes but are unable to take any action because of Jaikant's political powers. DSP Satyam Patkar, Singham's senior, is on Jaikant's payroll and takes care in concealing and eliminating the evidence of Jaikant's crime from the eyes of the law. Singham, upon learning of Kadam's tragedy from the colleagues and Megha, and taking cues from what he has already seen, tries to take this to the notice of DGP Vikram Pawar but it turns out to be of no use as there is no evidence against Jaikant and Patkar. Local minister Narvekar soon adds to Singham's troubles when he refuses to support him against Jaikant, later launching the latter as a candidate from his local political party. Feeling defeated and mentally tortured by Jaikant to no limits, a worried Singham first contemplates returning home but is stopped by Kavya, who encourages him to fight against the evil and not run away like a coward. At that point, some of Jaikant's henchmen attack him, and he, realizing the futility of returning to Shivgad, brutally beats the goons black and blue, locking them up.

Singham then arrests Shiva in a fake case of illegally smuggling alcohol after setting him up to tear the FIR against the goons, who he had come to free, and recalling to the officers that Shiva, under Jaikant's orders, had planted bundles of cash in Kadam's jeep. Later, he thwarts off Patkar in full view of the public when Patkar, bounded by his duties to Jaikant, tries to bail Shiva out. Jaikant kidnaps Kavya's younger sister Anjali for ransom on Kavya's birthday. Rescuing her, Singham successfully traces the origins of the kidnapping racket to Jaikant, confronting Narvekar with his team in anger, but is unable to arrest him as he wins the election and is set to become a minister of the Goa Government.

Jaikant's party wins the elections, he hands over transfer orders to Singham to go back to Shivgad within 24 hours. That night, at a police function organized for the officers with their families, Singham confronts the officers, particularly Pawar and Patkar, for not abiding by their duties and being dishonest and unfaithful to their profession by protecting Jaikant. At first, Patkar berates Singham, but filled with guilt, Phadnis, Abbas and Sawalkar decide to help Singham fight Jaikant. Soon, he is joined by the entire Goa Police Force, with Pawar also extending support, and all of them invade Jaikant's home to kill him, with Patkar revealing himself to be in support of Singham in a twist. Jaikant eventually escapes but after running through the city, he is arrested by the police the next morning. They bring him to the police station and shoot him dead on Kadam's chair, threatening Shiva moments after the showdown to change his statement. At a media conference, while proving Jaikant and Narvekar guilty, Pawar and Singham clear the late Kadam of all corruption charges.

The film ends with Singham and the other police officers saluting Megha.

Cast 

 Ajay Devgn as Inspector Bajirao Singham, a police officer with unparalleled strength and wit of mind, one would say, close to godliness; his sheer existence is enough to cripple entire criminal empires and strike fear into the minds of those who oppose him.
 Prakash Raj as Jaikant Shikre, a corrupt politician and businessman who clashes with Bajirao
 Kajal Aggarwal as Kavya Bhosle, Bajirao's family friend and love interest
 Sudhanshu Pandey as Inspector Rakesh Kadam (Special Appearance)
 Sonali Kulkarni as Megha Kadam, Rakesh's wife
 Sachin Khedekar as Gautam "Gotya" Bhosle, Kavya's father and Manikrao's friend
 Govind Namdev as Manikrao "Manya" Singham, Bajirao's father
 Meghna Vaidya as Lata Singham, Bajirao's mother
 Ashok Saraf as Head-Constable Prabhu Sawalkar
 Murali Sharma as DSP Satyam Patkar, a corrupt police officer in league with Jaikant
 Ashok Samarth as Shiva Naik, Jaikant's right-hand man
 Ankur Nayyar as Sub-Inspector Abbas Malik
 Vijay Patkar as Havaldar Ramesh Kelkar
 Sana Amin Sheikh as Anjali Bhosle, Kavya's younger sister
 Anant Jog as Minister Anant Narvekar
 Besant Ravi as Sangam Talkies Goon
  as Sub-Inspector Dev Phadnis
 Suchitra Bandekar as Savita Bhosle, Kavya's mother
 Kishore Nandlaskar as Narvekar's peon
 Naushad Abbas as Jaikant's henchman
 Hari Bala as Nandu Singh, a villager in Shivgarh
 Vikash Kadam as Sadha Singh, a villager in Shivgarh
 Pradeep Velankar as DGP Vikram Pawar, Goa Police
 Harish Shetty as Vitthal Dalvi, Jaikant's ally
 Jayant Sawarkar as Kamalkant Bhosle, Kavya's grandfather
 Suhasini Deshpande as Suhasini Bhosle, Kavya's grandmother
 Ravindra Berde as Zamindar Chandrakant
 Agastya Dhanorkar as Nitin, Rakesh Kadam's son
 Neeraj Khetrapal as Jaikant's lawyer

Production
After the success of the Tamil film Singam, directed by Hari in 2010, the film's remake rights were sold by the producers for Hindi and Kannada versions. The co-producers of the Tamil version, Reliance Big Pictures purchased the Hindi remake rights and announced in November 2010 that the version would feature Rohit Shetty as director and Ajay Devgn in the lead role. Prakash Raj was signed on to reprise his role as the antagonist from the original, whilst reports emerged that Asin and Anushka Shetty were being considered for the female lead role.

In mid-February 2011, Kajal Aggarwal, an actress who predominantly features in South Indian films was signed in as the female lead.

Singham went on floors in November 2010, with its scheduled cast. The first schedule began in early March 2011 with action sequences shot in Goa featuring technicians from South India.

A scene with Prakash Raj and Ajay Devgn was shot in Goregaon in Mumbai with around 500 junior artists as villagers. Another scene was shot at Vagator in Goa for which 100 police jeeps were called. The shooting was stalled by the Federation of Western India Cine Employees (FWICE) members who demanded 45 lakh to be paid to the workers when it was being shot in Film City in Mumbai.

Release 
Reliance Entertainment released Singham on 22 July 2011 in 2000 screens worldwide with 1500 prints excluding overseas.  The film's DVD was released on 23 August 2011. The Delhi High Court, upon Reliance Entertainment's request, issued an order to all Indian ISPs to block file sharing sites to prevent unauthorized sharing of Singham.

Reception

Critical reception 
The film received mixed to positive reviews from critics. Nikhat Kazmi of The Times of India gave it four out of five stars and stated "Singham is over-the-top retro kitsch, spilling over with high-voltage stunts, slow-motion action cuts and fiery dialogues delivered in high decibels. It is meant for all those action buffs interested in time travel to the angry young 1970s and 1980s when cinema was larger-than-life and totally unrealistic. But then, retro is currently chic, isn't it?" Komal Nahta of Koimoi gave it four and a half stars out of five and said "On the whole, Singham is a powerful action-emotional drama which boasts of equally powerful dialogues and absolutely power-packed performances. It's a super-hit and will be loved by the masses and the classes, the men and the women, the young and the old, the rich and the poor. It is the kind of film which consumes the viewer and gives him the feeling that he was part of the fight against corruption! The film has immense repeat-value. Its business in Maharashtra will get a further boost because of the liberal use of Marathi in the dialogues. Kajal Aggarwal acts with effortless ease. Her performance is good." Suparna Sharma of The Asian Age gave it two out of five stars and stated "Singham is a primitive, archetypal genre piece, and it is a hit. Rohit Shetty taps into the sentiment of the moment – emasculation, frustration – and gratifies it. But endowing a cop with nobility doesn't ring true, especially not when he is neither Chulbul-charming nor when the target of his anger and lashing is generic sleaze... Singham is vigilante cop let loose on all things foul. I felt fluctuating connect with Singham, but mostly he made me queasy." Taran Adarsh of Bollywood Hungama gave the film four and a half stars out of five and said "Singham pays homage to the action films of the 1970s, which was known for the heroism, death-defying action sequences and pulse-pounding thrills. It's an acknowledgement to one of the most successful genres of Bollywood – action movies – known for the trademark good versus evil themes and well choreographed stunts." Saibal Chatterjee from NDTV also gave four out of five stars and said "Singham is an old-fashioned but rousing Hindi commercial film that pretty much restores one's faith in this often-maligned brand of cinema. It has super-duper hit written all over it. No matter how dismissive you might be of films that have no space for shades of grey, chances are that Singham will disarm you, if only for a bit." Dailybhaskar gave a score of three stars out of five and said "The action takes over the romance in the film. Go for it, if you want to catch one hell of an action flick! "

Sukanya Venkatraghavan from Filmfare gave two stars out of five and said "Singham is a film that will invoke wolf whistles and applause from its audience. It is gloriously massy. The movie knows its job and does it well. It does nothing out of the box to grab your attention and yet it does. Pretty easily. Watch it for its robust potboiler personality. With extra masala as garnish. Ajay Devgan pulls out all stops for this one. He is fierce and impactful. This is his show all the way. His quirky forte for comedy too comes forth in the ubiquitous ha ha sequences with leading lady Kajal Aggarwal who looks pretty and has done what she has been told to, but probably deserved a meatier debut." Kaveree Bamzai from India Today gave three out of five stars and deemed that "Mr Devgn tries hard, growling like a Singham, and acting like a superman, but I was more interested in Prakash Raj's two tone Al Capone shoes." Raja Sen from Rediff gave one and a half stars out of five and said "All I can personally say about this trend of remaking one-note Southern hits as a viewer is that it's an exhausting one. It is in the tiny victories that we must seek refuge after a film like this: I'm just glad the hero, so eager to peel off his uniform, left his pants on." Sudhish Kamath from The Hindu said "The original wasn't the best film around but it had a few smarts, pace and fury, and worked despite its cheesy visual effects purely because of Suriya who made the corniest lines sound good. Devgn does exactly the opposite. He takes some half-decent lines (by Farhad and Sajid) and makes them sound cheesy." Rajeev Masand of CNN-IBN gave 2 stars out of 5, commenting "Remake of the 2010 Tamil blockbuster of the same name, 'Singham' has occasional bursts of comedy (both puerile and genuinely funny), but it's never quite as entertaining as the similarly intentioned 'Dabangg'."

Shubha Shetty Saha from MiD DAY gave the film a score of two stars and deemed that "Nothing turns director Rohit Shetty on more than cars meeting mid air. We all know that by now. And this film has some breath taking action sequences, too. That's about it is." Meenakshi Rao from The Pioneer describes the film as "the David Dhawan of action, or for that matter the Golmaal of fights. To keep the audience engaged all through such unending babble needs some kind of acumen which normal people do not always have and through which people like Rohit Shetty get to make a whole lot of money, if not sense." giving it seven out of ten stars. Kunal Guha from Yahoo! Movies gave two stars and says that "The film's assumption that mispronunciation is funny makes us endure words like honest (with a loud 'h'), clean cheet (clean chit), noun-saans (nonsense) and sooocide (suicide). The dialogues are spouted with immense enthusiasm but the words defuse the intensity and make them seem trivial. Devgn does a fair job and conveys sufficient conviction and humility through his character. Kajal Aggarwal makes an unobjectionable debut and her eyes would surely inspire a few compliments."

Box office 
Singham started extremely well at single screens with occupancy around 90% and was average at multiplexes with 50%–60% occupancy, In the first four days, the film collected . After five days, the earnings were around  without any drop. The film is currently the sixth highest second week grosser. The third weekend collections were estimated to be . Singham earned  nett in India, at the end of its theatrical run.

The film grossed over  worldwide. It has grossed a total of  worldwide, including  in India and  overseas.

Soundtrack 

The music of the film was composed by Ajay–Atul, with lyrics penned by Swanand Kirkire.

Track listing

Reception 

The album was panned by music critics. Joginder Tuteja of Bollywood Hungama awarded the album two stars out of five and said "Singham turns out to be a fine album though one does feel that there could have been much more than just three songs here. While 'Saathiyaa' is the pick of the lot and has the potential to play on beyond the theatrical run of the film as well, title song "Singham" brings in the right mood despite its setting. However given the fact that the film is not quite a musical and the focus would be primarily on pushing its action flavour, the album would find it tough to make much of a mark commercially." Tanuj Manchanda of Planet Bollywood gave the album five and a half stars citing that "Ajay-Atul produces a satisfactory soundtrack, after their first attempt in Virudh and shows their versatility in a short span of 3 songs. One looks forward to their forthcoming venture My Friend Pinto which will be their second Bollywood film as composers. Overall, the songs are decent and have the ability in them to become a success. It will help in enhancing the film's narrative."

Accolades

Protests in Karnataka 

Singham had been removed from cinemas in Karnataka while some cinemas had cancelled the shows following pressure from various groups protesting against derogatory statements against the Kannadigas. Various organisations raised voices against the anti-Kannadiga dialogues in Singham and the film which was released faced problems in continuing with the shows. There was a demand to remove such scenes from the film and the filmmakers contemplated on the next course of action.

Singham commenced in Karnataka after the removal of some "objectionable" dialogues, a day after disruptions in its screening.

Legacy 
The music video for the 2020 Black Eyed Peas song "Action" pays tribute to Indian film action scenes, including Singham.

Animated series 

An animated series based on Singham premiered on Discovery Kids (India) in April 2018.

Sequel and spin-offs 

Singham Returns, a sequel to Singham directed by Shetty and produced by Ajay Devgn Films, released in 2014. Devgn reprises his role from the previous film, while also co-producing the project. Kareena Kapoor plays the female lead. The film was also simultaneously made in Marathi. The film was released worldwide on 15 August 2014. The plot is loosely based on the 1993 Malayalam film Ekalavyan.

Simmba, a spin-off to Singham directed by Shetty and produced by Dharma Productions, was released in 2018. Starring Ranveer Singh, the film features Sangram "Simmba" Bhalerao, a corrupt cop hailing from the same town as Singham. Devgn reprises his role in a special appearance. Another sequence or spin-off, Sooryavanshi, starring Akshay Kumar as another DCP named Veer Sooryavanshi who join hands with Simmba and Singham to stop a terrorist attack on Mumbai is directed again by Shetty. All these films are set in the Cop Universe.

Home media
Commemorating the film's ninth anniversary, Devgn revealed in a throwback post on his social media handles that the film had been made available to stream on Amazon Prime Video. Five months later, it was also simultaneously made available on Netflix.

References

External links 

 
 

2011 films
2010s Hindi-language films
Indian action films
2011 action films
Films shot in India
Films set in Goa
Hindi remakes of Tamil films
Fictional portrayals of the Maharashtra Police
Films directed by Rohit Shetty
Films scored by Ajay–Atul
Cop Universe
Reliance Entertainment films
Films shot in Goa
Hindi-language action films
Films adapted into television shows